Henry French may refer to:

 Henry F. French (1813–1885), agriculturist, inventor, lawyer, judge, postmaster, assistant district attorney, assistant Secretary of the United States Treasury, and author
Barney French (Henry Bernard French, 1922–2005), Australian politician, member of the New South Wales Legislative Council, 1973–1991
 Henry French (1812–1878), American steamboat builder; see Henry French House
Henry French v. H C Taylor on List of United States Supreme Court cases, volume 199, decided 1905
 Sir Henry French (civil servant) (1883–1966), English civil servant

See also

Harry Livingston French (1871–1928), American architect